List winners of USSR championship in Russian draughts.

The annual draughts competition was held in the USSR from 1924 to 1991. The first official championship was held in 1924 in Moscow. The last championship was held in 1991 in connection with the disintegration of the USSR. The championships were held in a round robin system. The first and second championships were held without time control and without recording the games, which became mandatory starting from the third championship. The regulation gave 1 hour for 15 moves. It lasted until 1972. 

Since 1952, the championship began to be held with quarterfinals, semi-finals and finals. In 1961, for the first time, the national championship final was held on the Swiss system. In 1969, the Swiss system semi-final was held with 70 athletes, in the final 10 checkers played in a two-round robin system. In 1972, the system of micro-matches, proposed by the Moscow master Vladimir Gagarin, was used for the first time, designed to increase the number of productive games. According to this system, the opponents had to determine the result of the game between them not in one game, but in two: one game had to be played with white, and the second with black, moreover, for the victory in a micro-match (with a score of 2-0 or 1.5-0.5) one point was given, half a point was given for a draw, 0 points for a defeat. In 1972, the semi-finals were played in a round robin system, in the finals in a round robin system, for the first time, micro-matches of two games with a shortened time control were played: 1 hour 10 minutes for the first 35 moves and then 30 minutes for every 15 moves.  Since this year, the finals have been played using the micromatch system. In 1973, the selection for the finals was based on the results of the championships of sports societies, the finals were held according to the Swiss system with a shorter time control. At the 1984 championship, the draw for the mandatory first moves was used for the first time. Since this year, the finals have been held in two stages. At the first stage, the participants of the second stage were selected. At the second stage, the champion and prize-winners were determined.

The last championship was held in 1991 in connection with the disintegration of the USSR, total 51 championships were held. This competition was the largest competition in Russian draughts, only at 1993 took place first Draughts-64 World Championship in Russian draughts.

References

External links
Архив журнала «Шашки» 1959-1992 
Архив журнала «Шашки» 1959-1992 на сайте Checkers USA

Literature
 XIV и XV первенства СССР по шашкам. А. И. Дрябезгов, А. М. Сидлин. — М. : Физкультура и спорт, 1955. — 352 с. 
 Методическое пособие СЛШИ. «От Медкова до Иванова». Авторы Ю.А. Арустамов, В.М. Высоцкий, С.Н. Горбачёв. 1990. 
 Журнал «Шашки» 1973 №12, с.11.

Draughts competitions